"You Don't Fool Me" is a song by Queen, from the 1995 album Made in Heaven. It was released as a single in 1996, containing various remixes of the song. The song is one of the few which were actually written and recorded after the Innuendo sessions, and was written and composed by the band, under David Richards' supervision. It proved to be Queen' s final European hit.

Background
"You Don't Fool Me" was one of the last tracks recorded for the album Made in Heaven and came about in a most unusual way. Brian May has explained on his website that the producer for the band, David Richards, more or less created the framework of the song single-handedly, building from bits of lyrics recorded just before Freddie Mercury's death. May has said that before Richards' work, there was no song to speak of. However, after Richards edited and mixed the song (including a bit of harmonies recorded for "A Winter's Tale"), he presented it to the remaining members of the band. Brian May, Roger Taylor and John Deacon then added their instruments and backing vocals and were surprised to end up with a finished song that had begun as nothing. The style of the song is reminiscent of their 1982 album Hot Space, and a comment over that featured on their Greatest Hits III album.

Music video
The video is set in a night club where a young man encounters his former girlfriend and recounts the memories of their brief relationship. The theme of the song could possibly be a continuation of the story set up by earlier Queen songs "Play the Game" and "It's a Hard Life".

Personnel

Freddie Mercury — lead and backing vocals
Brian May — electric guitar, backing vocals
Roger Taylor — drums, percussion, keyboards, backing vocals
John Deacon — bass guitar

Track listings

Original version
 CD single
 "You Don't Fool Me" (edit) — 3:54
 "You Don't Fool Me" (album version) — 5:25

 CD maxi
 "You Don't Fool Me" (album version) — 5:25
 "You Don't Fool Me" (edit) — 3:54
 "You Don't Fool Me" (Sexy Club Mix) — 10:18
 "You Don't Fool Me" (Dancing Divaz Club Mix) — 7:07

 12" maxi - Europe
 "You Don't Fool Me" (Sexy Club Mix)
 "You Don't Fool Me" (Dancing Divaz Club Mix)
 "You Don't Fool Me" (B.S. Project Remix)
 "You Don't Fool Me" (Dancing Divaz Instrumental club mix)

 12" maxi - U.S.
 "You Don't Fool Me" (Freddy's Club Mix) — 7:02
 "You Don't Fool Me" (album version) — 5:24
 "You Don't Fool Me" (Freddy's Revenge Dub) — 5:53
 "You Don't Fool Me" (Queen for a Day mix) — 6:33

Some US 12" promos do not feature the album version.

Remixes
 CD single
 "You Don't Fool Me" (B.S. Project remix - edit) — 3:15
 "You Don't Fool Me" (edit) — 4:40

 CD maxi - UK release only
 "You Don't Fool Me" (album version) — 5:24
 "You Don't Fool Me" (Dancing Divaz Club Mix) — 7:05
 "You Don't Fool Me" (Sexy Club mix) — 10:53
 "You Don't Fool Me" (Late Mix) — 10:34

 12" maxi - UK release only
 "You Don't Fool Me" (Dancing Divaz Club Mix) — 7:05
 "You Don't Fool Me" (Late Mix) — 10:34
 "You Don't Fool Me" (Sexy Club Mix) — 10:53
 "You Don't Fool Me" (album version) — 5:24

 Cassette single (plays the same on both sides)
 "You Don't Fool Me" (album version) — 5:24
 "You Don't Fool Me" (Dancing Divaz Club Mix) — 7:05

The Sexy Club Mix is the nearly the same on all formats.  The UK CD and 12" versions list the wrong time of 10:53, when it should only be 10:18 like the other formats list it.  The UK CD version has a mastering error and the first 4 seconds are lost, bringing the running time down to 10:14.

1995 remixes
"B.S. Project Remix" (Remix by M. Marcolin and Bob Salton)
"B.S. Project Remix - Edit" (Remix by M. Marcolin and Bob Salton)
"Dancing Divaz [Instrumental] Club Mix" (Remix by Dancing Divaz)
"Dancing Divaz Rhythm Mix" (Remix by Dancing Divaz)
"Dub Dance Single Mix" (Remix by David Richards)
"Freddy's Club Mix" (Remix by Freddy Bastone)
"Freddy's Revenge Dub" (Remix by Freddy Bastone)
"Late Mix" (Remix by David Richards)
"Queen For A Day Mix" (Remix by Freddy Bastone)
"Queen Forever Megamix" (Remix by Freddy Bastone)
"Sexy Club Mix" (Remix by Jam & Spoon)

The "Queen Forever Megamix" features vocal samples from a few different Queen songs, but not "You Don't Fool Me".  It was only released on the limited edition orange promo vinyl disc in the UK.

Charts

1 Remixes

References

External links
 
 Lyrics at Queen official website

Queen (band) songs
1996 singles
Parlophone singles
Songs written by Freddie Mercury
Songs written by Roger Taylor (Queen drummer)
Songs released posthumously
1995 songs
Hollywood Records singles
Songs written by Brian May
Songs written by John Deacon